The North Dakota Horse Park is a horse racing venue in Fargo, North Dakota, located on 19th Ave N west of Interstate 29.

The park is licensed for up to 9 days of racing in 2013, though each year it is typically open for one weekend of racing in late July.

External links
North Dakota Horse Park
The Racing Journal: North Dakota Horse Park

References

Gambling in North Dakota
Horse racing venues in North Dakota
Tourist attractions in Fargo, North Dakota